Ollie Holland (born 19 June 1994 in Nottingham) is a professional squash player who represents England. He reached a career-high world ranking of World No. 127 in May 2013.

References

External links 

English male squash players
Living people
1994 births